The Democratic Union (DÚ) was a liberal party in Slovakia.

History
The party was established on 25 March 1995 by a merger of the Democratic Union of Slovakia and the National Democratic Party, and was led by was Eduard Kukan.  In 1998, it joined the Slovak Democratic Coalition, and in 2000, it merged into the Slovak Democratic and Christian Union.

References

Defunct political parties in Slovakia
Liberal conservative parties in Slovakia
Liberal parties in Slovakia
Defunct liberal political parties
Political parties established in 1995
Political parties disestablished in 2000
1995 establishments in Slovakia
2000 disestablishments in Slovakia